Abba Silvanus (d. before 414) was a Palestinian Christian monk who lived during the 4th and 5th centuries. He was one of the Desert Fathers.

Biography
Silvanus was born in Palestine. He led a community of 12 disciples in Scetis, Egypt, one of whom was Mark the Calligrapher. In 380, the group moved from Scetis to Sinai, and then later moved to Gaza. He died sometime before 414 A.D. and was succeeded by Zacharias, one of his disciples.

References

4th-century births
5th-century deaths
4th-century Christian monks
Desert Fathers
Palestinian Christian clergy